Tonia may refer to:

 Tonia, Lesser Poland Voivodeship
 Tonia, Greater Poland Voivodeship
 Tonia (singer) (born 1947), Belgian singer
 Tonia (name)

See also
 
 Teladoma tonia (T. tonia) a moth species
 Latonia (disambiguation)
 Tonya (disambiguation)
 Tania (disambiguation)
 Tanja (disambiguation)
 Tanya (disambiguation)
Tonina (disambiguation)